Woodland is wooded land.

It may also refer to:

Places

United Kingdom
 Woodland, County Durham, England
 Woodland, Cumbria, England
 Woodland, Devon, England

United States
 Woodland, Alabama
 Woodland, California
 Woodland (Washington, D.C.), a neighborhood
 Woodland, Georgia
 Woodland (Eatonton, Georgia), a National Register of Historic Places listing in Putnam County, Georgia
 Woodland (Lumber City, Georgia)
 Woodland (Lexington, Kentucky), a National Register of Historic Places listing in Fayette County, Kentucky
 Woodland (Nicholasville, Kentucky), a National Register of Historic Places listing in Jessamine County, Kentucky
 Cave City, Kentucky or Woodland
 Woodland, Illinois
 Woodland, Indiana
 Woodland, Aroostook County, Maine
 Woodland, Washington County, Maine
 Woodland, Maryland
 Woodland, Michigan
 Woodland Township, Michigan
 Woodland, Minnesota
 Woodland Township, Minnesota
 Woodland (Duluth), Minnesota, a neighborhood
 Woodland, Mississippi
 Woodland, Missouri
 Woodland Township, New Jersey
 Woodland, North Carolina
 Woodland, Ohio
 Woodland (St. Thomas Township, Franklin County, Pennsylvania)
 Woodland (Huntsville, Texas), a National Historic Landmark house on the campus of Sam Houston State University
 Woodland, Utah
 Woodland, Washington
 Woodland, Wisconsin, a town in Sauk County
 Woodland, Dodge County, Wisconsin, an unincorporated community

Parks
 Arthur B. Ripley Desert Woodland State Park, California
 Woodland Park (Seattle), Washington
 Woodland Park Zoo in Seattle

Camouflage patterns
 US Woodland, the default camouflage pattern issued to United States soldiers, marines, airmen, and sailors from 1981 until its replacement around 2006
 TAZ 90 (camouflage) or Swiss Woodland, the camouflage patterns for current standard issue Battle dress uniform of the Swiss Armed Forces

Railway stations
Woodland railway station, a station in Cumbria, England
Woodlands railway station, a station on the Schull and Skibbereen Railway in County Cork, Ireland
Woodland (MBTA station), a station in Newton, Massachusetts

Other uses
 Whitefaced Woodland,a sheep breed
 Woodland cemetery, a type of cemetery
 Woodland period, a period of pre-Columbian Native American history
 Woodland management
 Woodland Regional High School, a high school in Beacon Falls, Connecticut
 Woodland Trust

People with the surname
 Albert Woodland (1895–1955), English cricketer
 Arthur Woodland (1889–1941), English footballer
 Barry Woodland, British former Grand Prix motorcycle road racer
 Donald L. Woodland (1930–1994), Ohio state senator
 Gary Woodland (born 1984), American professional golfer
 Lauren Woodland (born 1977), American actress and attorney
 Luke Woodland (born 1995), footballer
 Norman Joseph Woodland (1921–2012), American co-inventor of the barcode
 Philip Charles Woodland, British engineer
 Rae Woodland (1922–2013), British soprano
 Rich Woodland, Jr. (born 1970), American stock car racing driver
 Vincent Reynolds Woodland (1879–1933), British colonial administrator

See also

 Skogskyrkogården (The Woodland Cemetery), Stockholm, Sweden
 Woodland, Maine (disambiguation)
 Woodland Beach, Michigan
 Woodland Cemetery (disambiguation)
 Woodland Corner, Wisconsin, an unincorporated community
 Woodland Heights, Pennsylvania
 Woodland Hills (disambiguation)
 Woodland Mills, Tennessee
 Woodland Park (disambiguation)
 Woodland Plantation (West Pointe a la Hache, Louisiana)
 Woodland Plantation (Church Hill, Mississippi)
 Woodland Terrace, Tampa, Florida
 Woodlands (disambiguation)
 The Woodlands (disambiguation)
 
 
 Wood (disambiguation)
 Land (disambiguation)